The 1966 season was the Minnesota Vikings' sixth in the National Football League. Sixth-year head coach Norm Van Brocklin resigned at the end of the season, after the team finished with a 4–9–1 record.

Offseason

1966 Draft

 The Vikings traded OG Palmer Pyle to the Chicago Bears in exchange for Chicago's fifth-round selection (76th overall).
 The Vikings trade LB Bill Swain to the New York Giants in exchange for the sixth-round selection the Giants acquired from the Pittsburgh Steelers (83rd overall).
 The Vikings traded their sixth-round selection (87th overall) and 1965 seventh-round selection (92nd overall) to the Detroit Lions in exchange for DT Mike Bundra and E Larry Vargo.
 The Vikings traded their eighth-round selection (120th overall) and LB John Campbell to the Baltimore Colts in exchange for OT Larry Kramer.
 The Vikings traded their 10th-round selection (148th overall) to the Detroit Lions in exchange for DB Gary Lowe.
 The Vikings traded their 20th-round selection (298th overall) to the Philadelphia Eagles in exchange for HB Billy Ray Barnes.

Roster

Preseason

Regular season

Schedule

 A bye week was necessary as the league had expanded to an odd number (15) of teams (Atlanta); one team was idle each week.

Standings

Statistics

Team leaders

League rankings

References

Minnesota Vikings seasons
Minnesota
Minnesota Vikings